Independent Jewish Voices (IJV) is an organization launched on 5 February 2007 by 150 prominent British Jews such as Nobel laureate Harold Pinter, historian Eric Hobsbawm, lawyer Sir Geoffrey Bindman, Lady Ellen Dahrendorf, film director Mike Leigh, and actors Stephen Fry and Zoë Wanamaker. The organization is reportedly "born out of a frustration with the widespread misconception that the Jews of this country speak with one voice—and that this voice supports the Israeli government's policies". IJV stated it was founded "to represent British Jews...in response to a perceived pro-Israeli bias in existing Jewish bodies in the UK", and, according to Hobsbawn, "as a counter-balance to the uncritical support for Israeli policies by established bodies such as the Board of Deputies of British Jews".

Declaration
The group's Declaration states:

Its signatories attest to being guided by five principles presented in the Declaration:

Human rights are universal and indivisible and should be upheld without exception.  This is as applicable in Israel and the occupied Palestinian territories as it is elsewhere.
Palestinians and Israelis alike have the right to peace and security.
Peace and stability require the willingness of all parties to the conflict to comply with international law.
There is no justification for any form of racism, including anti-Semitism, anti-Arab racism or Islamophobia, in any circumstance.
The battle against anti-Semitism is vital and is undermined whenever opposition to Israeli government policies is automatically branded as anti-Semitic.

Signatories to the Declaration state their shared beliefs that "the interests of an occupying power should not count for more than the human rights of an occupied people" and that "the Palestinian inhabitants of the West Bank and the Gaza Strip face appalling living conditions with desperately little hope for the future"; they pledge their "support for a properly negotiated peace between the Israeli and Palestinian people and oppose any attempt by the Israeli government to impose its own solutions on the Palestinians".

Signatories

Signatories include Lisa Appignanesi, Sir Geoffrey Bindman, Gerald Cohen, Stanley Cohen, Lady Ellen Dahrendorf, Jenny Diski, Nicole Farhi, Stephen Fry, Alexander Goehr, Eric Hobsbawm, Ann Jungman, Anne Karpf, Beeban Kidron, Brian Klug, David Lan, Mike Leigh, Steven Lukes, Shula Marks, Mike Marqusee, Adam Phillips, Harold Pinter, Nigel Rodley, Jacqueline Rose, Leon Rosselson, Andrew Samuels, Richard Sennett, Avi Shlaim, Gillian Slovo, Shawn Slovo, Janet Suzman, Zoë Wanamaker, Sami Zubaida and David Feldman.

Responses
According to Amiram Barkat, in his article "U.K. Board of Deputies Rejects Criticism from New Jewish Group", published in Haaretz, a spokesperson for the Board of Deputies has responded to the IJV's launching: "If Brian Klug and the other signatories to IJV chose to engage with the institutions of the Jewish community, rather than shouting from the sidelines, they may find that most Jews disagree with much of what they say".

"End the siege of Gaza!"

In early 2008, 250 members of Independent Jewish Voices signed a statement entitled "End the siege of Gaza!", which was printed as a full-page advertisement in The Times.  The statement called on Israel to lift its economic blockade while condemning both collective punishment against the people of Gaza and Palestinian rocket attacks into Israel, and encouraging both sides to observe a cease-fire.

See also
 Blockade of the Gaza Strip
 Independent Australian Jewish Voices
 Independent Jewish Voices (Canada)
 Israeli–Palestinian conflict
 Palestine: Peace Not Apartheid
 Euston Manifesto
 'Progressive' Jewish Thought and the New Anti-Semitism

References

Further reading and related resources
Barkat, Amiram.  "U.K. Board of Deputies Rejects Criticism from New Jewish Group." Haaretz 7 February 2007.  Retrieved 8 February 2007.
Goodman, Amy.  "Independent Jewish Voices: New British Group Speaks Out on Israeli Policies in Occupied Territories."  Interview with Sir Geoffrey Bindman and Susie Orbach.  Rush Transcript.  Democracy Now! 9 February 2007.  Retrieved 9 February 2007.  (Streaming audio and MP3 links.)
Klug, Brian.  "Who Speaks for Jews in Britain?" Guardian Online, Comment is free (blog) 5 February 2007.  Retrieved 8 February 2007.  (Incl. link to "a full list of articles in the Independent Jewish Voices debate.")
"Press coverage of IJV Launch."
Introduction of IJV and partly translation of declaration in German.

External links
Official website
Essays by IJV signatories and supporters in the Guardian's Comment is free

Organizations established in 2007
Arab–Israeli conflict
Jewish political organizations
Jewish anti-occupation groups
Jews and Judaism in the United Kingdom